The seventy-third Oregon Legislative Assembly was the Oregon Legislative Assembly (OLA)'s period from 2005 to 2006. (The Legislative Assembly is the legislative body of the U.S. state of Oregon, composed of the Oregon State Senate and the Oregon House of Representatives.) There was a regular session in 2005, and a one-day special session on April 20, 2006.

The Senate was controlled by the Democratic Party of Oregon during the 73rd legislature, and the House was controlled by the Oregon Republican Party.

The 2005 regular session was the second longest in Oregon history, lasting 208 days, from January until August.

Two members of the House (Dan Doyle, R-Salem and Kelley Wirth, D-Corvallis) resigned due to unrelated scandals in 2005.

Partisan control

Senators of the 2005 Legislative Session
Senate President: Peter Courtney (D-11 Salem) 
President Pro Tem: Margaret Carter (D-22 Portland)
Majority Leader: Kate Brown (D-21 Portland)
Minority Leader: Ted Ferrioli (R-30 John Day)

Representatives
Speaker: Karen Minnis (R-49 Wood Village) 
Speaker Pro Tempore: Dennis Richardson (R-4 Central Point) 
Majority Leader: Wayne Scott (R-39 Oregon City)
Assistant Majority Leader: Debi Farr (R-14 Eugene)
Assistant Majority Leader: Billy Dalto (R-21 Salem)
Majority Whip: Derrick Kitts (R-30 Hillsboro)
Democratic Minority Leader: Jeff Merkley (D-47 Portland)

See also
Oregon State Capitol
Oregon Legislative Assembly
Oregon State Senate
Oregon House of Representatives
Oregon statewide elections, 2006
Seventy-fourth Oregon Legislative Assembly

References

External links 
 Chronology of regular legislative sessions from Oregon Blue Book
 Chronology of special legislative sessions from Blue Book
 List of members of 2005 session from Oregon State Archives
 Committee assignments
 Official summary of bills considered in the 2005 regular session
 Official summary of bills considered in the 2006 special session

73
2005 in American politics
2006 in American politics
2005 in Oregon
2006 in Oregon
2005 U.S. legislative sessions
2006 U.S. legislative sessions